Mersin İdmanyurdu (also Mersin İdman Yurdu, Mersin İY, or MİY) Sports Club; located in Mersin, east Mediterranean coast of Turkey in 1968–69. Mersin İdmanyurdu (MİY) football team took place in Turkish First Football League, the first level division for the second time in 1968–69 season. They finished sixth. They have eliminated from Turkish Cup at first round. They represented Turkey in a friendly cup played in Tehran, Iran. Osman Arpacıoğlu became the first player of MİY capped in Turkey national football team when he was playing in the team.

Executive committee: Mehmet Karamehmet (president); Mahir Turhan, Ünal Şıhman (vice-presidents); Erol Tarhan (general captain); Şinasi Develei (general secretary); Şükrü Soydan (club director); Çetin Hocaer (treasurer); Cemal Evrim (audit); Sedat Gülergün, Aydın Özlü, Yılmaz Ok, Sadık Eliyeşil, Sungur Baydur, Necati Bolkan (members). Club address: Bahçelievler/Mersin. Tel. no: none. Turgay Şeren was the head coach; Bayram Birinci was his assistant. Şeren had targeted 10th position before the start of the season, but the team performed better.

Pre-season
Preparation games:
 11.08.1968 - MİY-Antalyaspor: 2-0. Sunday. Mersin.
 18.08.1968 - Antalyaspor-MİY: 2-2. Sunday. Antalya.
 25.08.1968 - MİY-PTT: 3-1. Sunday. Mersin.
 01.09.1968 - Ispartaspor-MİY: 0-2. Sunday. Isparta.
 08.09.1968 - MİY-Gençlerbirliği: 1-0. Sunday. Mersin. Goal: Osman (P).

1968–69 First League participation
First League was played with 16 teams in its eleventh season, 1968–69. Last two teams relegated to Second League 1969–70. Mersin İY became sixth with 11 wins, and Osman Arpacıoğlu was most scorer player with 14 goals.

Coach Turgay Şeren declared that the team was very young (age average was 21) and that they will fight for championship next year. However, he resigned after the end of season. It was Şeren's first experience in his coaching career. Şeren left the team at the end of the season, on 9 July 1969.

Results summary
Mersin İdmanyurdu (MİY) 1968–69 First League summary:

Sources: 1968–69 Turkish First Football League pages.

League table
Mersin İY's league performance in First League in 1968–69 season is shown in the following table.

Won, drawn and lost points are 2, 1 and 0. F belongs to MİY and A belongs to corresponding team for both home and away matches.

Results by round
Results of games MİY played in 1968–69 First League by rounds:

First half

Second half

1968–69 Turkish Cup participation
1968–69  Turkish Cup was played for the 7th season as Türkiye Kupası by 31 teams. Two elimination rounds (including one preliminary round) and finals were played in two-legs elimination system. Mersin İdmanyurdu participated in 1968–69  Turkish Cup and was eliminated at first round by Bursaspor. Bursaspor was eliminated in semifinals by Göztepe who won the Cup for the first time.

Cup track
The drawings and results Mersin İdmanyurdu (MİY) followed in 1968–69 Turkish Cup are shown in the following table.

Note: In the above table 'Score' shows For and Against goals whether the match played at home or not.

Game details
Mersin İdmanyurdu (MİY) 1968–69 Turkish Cup game reports is shown in the following table.
Kick off times are in EET and EEST.

Source: 1968–69 Turkish Cup pages.

1969 Friendship Cup
MİY represented Turkey in 1969 Friendship Cup played in Tehran, Iran. The tournament was play in honour of Shah Reza Pahlavi's birthday. MİY took third place.

 06.03.1969 - MİY-Pakistan: 4–1.
 09.03.1969 - Iran-MİY: 2–1.
 11.03.1969 - Spartak Moscow-MİY: 2–0.
 13.03.1969 - MİY-Iraq: 1–0. Goal: Ali 20'.

Management

Club management
Mehmet Karamehmet was club president.

Coaching team

1968–69 Mersin İdmanyurdu head coaches:

Note: Only official games were included.

1968–69 squad
Stats are counted for 1968–69 First League matches and 1968–69 Turkish Cup (Türkiye Kupası) matches. In the team rosters four substitutes were allowed to appear, two of whom were substitutable. Only the players who appeared in game rosters were included and listed in the order of appearance.

Sources: 1968–69 season squad data from maçkolik.com, Milliyet, and Erbil (1975).

Transfer news from Milliyet:
 Summer transfers: Taner (Galata), Yurdaer (Kasımpaşa), Cihat (Bandırnaspor), İbrahim (Tekirdağspor), Şefik (İskenderunspor 1967), Arif (Feriköy SK), Muharrem (Boluspor), Mustafa (Konya İdmanyurdu). Amateurs: Erdinç, İbrahim, Erol (Silifkespor), Olcay (Boluspor), Tevfik (Tarsus İdmanyurdu). Abdullah (amateur).
 Transfers out: Olcay (Galatasaray); İhsan (Gençlerbirliği). Necdet (Feriköy). Yurdaer (Vefa).

National team appearances:
 Osman was capped in national team against Saudi Arabia (03.01.1969) and Poland (27.04.1969). İbrahim was capped in U-21 national team for Balkan U-21 tournament in Romania between 22–29 June 1969.

After the season Kadri put an end to his player career and later become a manager.
 08.06.1969 - Kadri's jubilee match, MİY against Celebrities. Sunday, 17:00. Tevfik Sırrı Gür Stadium, Mersin. Celebrities-MİY: 5-5. Referee: Kemal Bunu. Celebrities: Turgay, Ercan, Basri, Yusuf, Talat, Kaya, Ogün, Şeref, Metin, Can, Uğur. Substitutions: Varol, Süreyya, Faruk, Muzaffer, Abdullah, Ahmet Şahin, Yaşar, Gökmen, Mazlum, Akın, Çeloviç, Harun. MİY: Fikret, Halim, Alp, Abdullah, İbrahim, Kadri, Ali, Tarık, Osman, Ayhan, Erol. Goals (in order): Metin, Ogün, Can, Kadri, Uğur, Kadri, Uğur, Osman, Kadri, Kadri. President Mehmet Karamehmet and Governor Nihat Bor presented cups to Kadri.

See also
 Football in Turkey
 1968–69 Turkish First Football League
 1968–69 Turkish Cup

Notes and references

Mersin İdman Yurdu seasons
Turkish football clubs 1968–69 season